There are a number of systems of transport in Sierra Leone, a country in West Africa, which possess road, rail, air and water infrastructure, including a network of highways and several airports.

Just like Great Britain, Sierra Leone used to drive on the left hand side of the road. In March 1971, Sierra Leone had a change-over and started to drive on the right hand side of the road.  By law, it is forbidden to import and register cars with the steering wheel on the right hand side in Sierra Leone, but the in 2012 the government was failing at enforcing this law.

Railways 

There are 84 kilometres (52 mi) of railway in Sierra Leone, of which all is of a narrow   gauge.  Sierra Leone no longer has any common carrier railroads, as the  gauge Sierra Leone Government Railway from Freetown through Bo to Kenema and Daru with a branch to Makeni closed in 1974.  The country does not share rail links with adjacent countries, Guinea and Liberia.

The existing railroad is private and operated from 1933 until 1975 by the Sierra Leone Development Company's iron ore mines at Marampa, 66 km (41 mi) east-northeast of the port at Pepel.  It is now used on a limited basis.  Tecsbacos, the mining company, is reported in 2006 to have problems of theft and obstruction in operating the railway. 

  Further details of the project were announced in October 2010; Dawnus planned to construct 50 km of new line, and refurbish 67 km of existing line.

Talks started with Russia in 2006 to seek help to rebuild railways in the country, although choice of gauge is problematic, since the original  gauge is obsolete.

Walking 
Because of widespread poverty, high petroleum prices and a large portion of the population residing in small communities, walking is often the preferred method of transportation in Sierra Leone.

Highways 
There are 11,700 kilometres (7,270  mi) of highway in Sierra Leone, of which 936 km (582 mi) are paved.  When construction and reconstruction of roads and bridges in the country is complete, the Trans–West African Coastal Highway will cross Sierra Leone, connecting it to Conakry (Guinea), Monrovia (Liberia), and 11 other nations of the Economic Community of West African States (ECOWAS).

Water 
There are 800 km (497 mi) of waterways in Sierra Leone, of which 600 km (373 mi) are navigable year-round.

Major ports of Sierra Leone include: Bonthe, Freetown and Pepel.  Queen Elizabeth II Quay in Freetown represents the country's only deep water port facility capable of berthing large-hulled cargo or military vessels.  The country possesses a merchant marine of two cargo ships exceeding 1,000 GT.

Airports 
There are ten airports in Sierra Leone, of which one has paved runways (the length of which exceeds ). There are two heliports in the country.

References

External links
 UN Map of Sierra Leone